The Yamaha TY80 was a trials-styled motorcycle produced by Yamaha Motor Company from 1974 to 1984. It was part of a range that included the TY50P, TY50M, TY125, TY175 and TY250. It uses a gear configuration of neutral in the lowest position, and then the ascending gears going upwards from there; as opposed to most modern motorcycles which feature 1st gear in the lowest position, neutral up 1 half-click and then the ascending gears going upwards.

Specs

Capacity: 72cc
Type: Trials
Manufacturer: Yamaha
Engine: two-stroke
Made: 1974-1984
Gear change: four-speed, foot change manual
Tyres: Back: 3x14in Front: 2.5x16in

TY80
Two-stroke motorcycles